Jumeirah English Speaking School  is a British private school located in Dubai, UAE. Its original campus on Sheikh Zayed Road is a primary school; A second campus at Arabian Ranches has students from primary, secondary, and high school. As of December 2016, JESS had 2000 students enrolled.

The students in secondary school (Years 7 to 11) follow the British curriculum, with Year 11 students undertaking GCSE examinations. After the completion of GCSE, Year 12 and 13 students follow the International Baccalaureate Curriculum, taking part in the Diploma Programme.

History

JESS Jumeirah
The original JESS school in Jumeirah was founded in 1975 and celebrated its 40th birthday in 2015. The school was founded as a result of demand for institutions tailored to suit the needs of British families. At the time, the only other available school was the Dubai English Speaking School (DESS), which was over-subscribed.

First opened in an apartment near the Dubai Clock Tower, JESS only had 17 pupils in 2 classes. In 1976, due to the influx of students, the school relocated to the villa of the school's headteacher, Miss Blue.

In 1977, His Highness Sheikh Rashid bin Saeed Al Maktoum granted the school land in the Jumeirah district of Dubai, which is where the school is located.

JESS Arabian Ranches

In 2000s, the Emirates experienced an influx of expats, and as a result, the demand for education grew, leading to the opening of JESS Arabian Ranches in 2005. It was the first school in Dubai to be built as a part of a significant planned housing development (Arabian Ranches).

JESS Arabian Ranches opened in September 2005 with 573 pupils - a primary school, with Years 7 and 8 offered in secondary. A sixth form was opened in 2009, offering the International Baccalaureate Diploma Programme, due to the increasing demand for the program in Dubai. After 2009, the school started offering all years, from KG1 to Year 13.

Campus 
Both campuses are open air, with limited indoor corridors. The main campus at Arabian ranches features a purpose built cafeteria, exhibition/exam hall, art workshop, Design/Technology workshop along with both of the school's campuses containing swimming pools (2 for each campus), library,  a PE hall, a PE center, netball courts and multi-purpose sports fields. Each classroom has assigned lockers for each of the pupils. The Arabian Ranches site also contains a music centre, a lecture theater and an auditorium.

The sixth form building (added in 2009) contains a common room, a study hall, a dining area, and a locker room.

Curriculum 
Jumeirah English Speaking School incorporates the National Curriculum of England and the IB Diploma Programme in its courses.

Elementary students will start with the National Curriculum of England, with the secondary school students moving in to study the GCSE course from Year 10 to 11 and would start some of the content in Year 9. For the GCSE's each student would be able to pick their choice of 5 subjects along with having to take English, Mathematics and all Sciences. As well as needing to take at least one language either Arabic (which is mandatory), Spanish or French. There is also the option to take an extra language for an additional GCSE. Following the completion of the course, students then study either the International Baccalaureate Diploma Programme or the IB Courses Programme in Years 12 and 13.

The IBDP programme is very different to the Courses programme. During IBDP, students have to study 6 subjects, 3 taken at Standard Level (SL) and 3 taken at the Higher Level (HL). As well as that, students have to complete the "DP Core" consisting of Theory of Knowledge, Community and Service and the Extended Essay.

During the Courses programme, students can study 5 or 6 subjects, all of which may be taken at standard level. Community and Service is also mandatory.

BTEC Extended level 3 courses in Art, Business and Sport were introduced in 2017, as an alternative to the IB.

Extracurricular activities

General extracurricular activities 
The extracurricular activities offered change each term, based on decisions made by staff. Some of the extracurricular activities as of December 2016 are Pottery, School Productions, JESS newsletter, skiing, rock-climbing, instrumental lessons, golf, drama club, photography, Sudoku club, book club, film club, choir, art club, the history society, yoga, dance club, cooking club, trampoline club, gymnastics, and Aikido. Every year the Drama department does a school production for all of secondary open to all students. There are also many after school festivals that are used to show the different ways each one of the JESS students is talented.

Sports 
Just like the general activities, the sports offered are subject to change every term. As of December 2016, some of the sports offered include athletics, netball, rugby, hockey, horse riding, volleyball, football, swimming, basketball, and badminton. JESS is a school that take many sports students to train to be playing professionally or going to schools on a sports scholarship. JESS Sport gets you somewhere

KHDA Inspection Report

The Knowledge and Human Development Authority (KHDA) is an educational quality assurance authority based in Dubai, United Arab Emirates. It undertakes early learning, school and higher learning institution management and rates them, based on the performance of both the teachers and the students, with ratings ranging from "Unsatisfactory" to "Outstanding".

Below is a summary of the inspection ratings for the Jumeirah English Speaking School.

References

External links

 

British international schools in Dubai
Educational institutions established in 1975
1975 establishments in the United Arab Emirates